Connor Wesley Jones (born October 10, 1994) is an American professional baseball pitcher who is a free agent.

Amateur career
Jones attended Great Bridge High School in Chesapeake, Virginia. During his high school career he went 22–3 with a 1.68 earned run average (ERA). Jones was drafted by the San Diego Padres in the 21st round of the 2013 Major League Baseball draft but did not sign and attended the University of Virginia to play college baseball for the Virginia Cavaliers.

Jones spent his freshman year at Virginia mostly pitching out of the bullpen. He appeared in 25 games with one start and went 4–1 with a 3.13 ERA, 40 strikeouts and one save. As a sophomore in 2015, Jones became a starter and eventually became Virginia's ace after an injury to Nathan Kirby. He started the first game of the 2015 College World Series against Vanderbilt and took the loss after giving up four runs in  innings. Overall, he started 18 games, going 7–3 with a 3.19 ERA and 113 strikeouts. After the season, he played for the United States collegiate national team. Jones returned as Virginia's number one starter his junior year in 2016. In 15 starts, he was 11-1 with a 2.34 ERA and 1.19 WHIP.

Professional career

St. Louis Cardinals
Jones was selected in the 2016 Major League Baseball draft in the second round by the St. Louis Cardinals. He signed for $1.1 million, was assigned to the Gulf Coast League Cardinals, and was later promoted to the State College Spikes. He finished 2016 with a combined 3.68 ERA over  innings pitched with both teams. Jones spent a majority of the 2017 season with the Palm Beach Cardinals, starting 21 games and going 8-5 with a 3.97 ERA and 76 strikeouts over  innings. He pitched it one game for the Springfield Cardinals at the end of the season.

Jones began 2018 with Springfield. He was placed on the disabled list retroactive to April 16 and he was activated on May 6. He spent a majority of the year with Springfield, going 5-5 with a 3.80 ERA over 22 games (17 starts). He also started four games for the Memphis Redbirds, compiling a 6.46 ERA over  innings. After the season, the Cardinals assigned Jones to the Surprise Saguaros of the Arizona Fall League (AFL). In 2019, he spent a majority of the year back with Springfield, going 1-1 with a 4.66 ERA and 49 strikeouts over  innings pitched in relief. he returned to Memphis for a brief point at the season's end. He did not play a game in 2020 due to the cancellation of the minor league season. Jones spent the 2021 season with Memphis with whom he went 5-6 with a 5.91 ERA and fifty strikeouts over  innings. Jones was released by the Cardinals on March 28, 2022.

Seattle Mariners
On March 31, 2022, Jones signed a minor league contract with the Seattle Mariners organization. Jones spent the year with the Double-A Arkansas Travelers, starting 17 games but struggling to a 4-8 record and 7.02 ERA with 64 strikeouts in 74.1 innings pitched. On August 4, 2022, Jones underwent Tommy John surgery and missed the remainder of the season. He became a free agent following the 2022 season.

References

External links

Virginia Cavaliers bio

1994 births
Living people
Sportspeople from Chesapeake, Virginia
Baseball players from Virginia
Baseball pitchers
Virginia Cavaliers baseball players
Gulf Coast Cardinals players
State College Spikes players
Palm Beach Cardinals players
Springfield Cardinals players
Memphis Redbirds players
Surprise Saguaros players
Minor league baseball players
Arkansas Travelers players